Phosphine oxides are phosphorus compounds with the formula OPX3. When X = alkyl or aryl, these are organophosphine oxides. Triphenylphosphine oxide is an example. An inorganic phosphine oxide is phosphoryl chloride (POCl3).

Structure and bonding

Tertiary phosphine oxides
Tertiary phosphine oxides are the most commonly encountered phosphine oxides.  With the formula R3PO, they are tetrahedral compounds.  They are usually prepared by oxidation of tertiary phosphines.  The P-O bond is short and polar. According to molecular orbital theory, the short P–O bond is attributed to the donation of the lone pair electrons from oxygen p-orbitals to the antibonding phosphorus-carbon bonds. The nature of the P–O bond was once hotly debated.  Some discussions invoked a role for phosphorus-centered d-orbitals in bonding, but this analysis is not supported by computational analyses. In terms of simple Lewis structure, the bond is more accurately represented as a dative bond, as is currently used to depict an amine oxide.

Secondary phosphine oxides
Secondary phosphine oxides (SPOs), formally derived from secondary phosphines (R2PH), are again tetrahedral at phosphorus.  One commercially available example of a secondary phosphine oxide is diphenylphosphine oxide.  SPOs are used in the formulation of catalysts for cross coupling reactions.

Unlike tertiary phosphine oxides, SPOs often undergo further oxidation, which enriches their chemistry:
R2P(O)H  +  H2O2  →  R2P(O)OH  +  H2O
These reactions are preceded by tautomerization to the phosphinous acid (R2POH):
R2P(O)H     R2POH

Primary phosphine oxides
Primary phosphine oxides, formally oxidized derivatives of primary phosphines, are again tetrahedral at phosphorus.  With four different substituents (O, OH, H, R) they are chiral. The primary phosphine oxides subject to tautomerization, which leads to racemization, and further oxidation, analogous to the behavior of SPOs.  Additionally, primary phosphine oxides are susceptible to disproportionation to the phosphinic acid and the primary phosphine:
2RP(O)H2   →  RP(O)(H)OH +  2RPH2

Syntheses
Phosphine oxide are typically produced by oxidation of organophosphines.  The oxygen in air is often sufficiently oxidizing to fully convert trialkylphosphines to their oxides at room temperature:
R3P + 1/2 O2 → R3PO
This conversion is usually undesirable.  In order to suppress this reaction, air-free techniques are often employed when handling say, trimethylphosphine.  

Less basic phosphines, such as methyldiphenylphosphine are converted to their oxides by treatment with hydrogen peroxide:
 PMePh2  +  H2O2  →  OPMePh2  +  H2O

Phosphine oxides are generated as a by-product of the Wittig reaction:
R3PCR'2 + R"2CO → R3PO + R'2C=CR"2
Another albeit unconventional route to phosphine oxides is the thermolysis of phosphonium hydroxides:
[PPh4]Cl + NaOH → Ph3PO + NaCl + PhH

The hydrolysis of phosphorus(V) dihalides also affords the oxide:
R3PCl2 + H2O → R3PO + 2 HCl
A special nonoxidative route is applicable secondary phosphine oxides, which arise by the hydrolysis of the chlorophosphine.  An example is the hydrolysis of chlorodiphenylphosphine to give diphenylphosphine oxide:
Ph2PCl + H2O → Ph2P(O)H + HCl

Deoxygenation
The deoxygenation of phosphine oxides has been extensively developed because many useful stoichiometric reactions convert tertiary phosphines to the corresponding oxides. Regeneration of the tertiary phosphine requires cheap oxophilic reagents, which are usually silicon-based. These deoxygenation reactions can be subdivided into stoichiometric and catalytic processes.

Stoichiometric processes
Use of trichlorosilane is a standard laboratory method. Industrial routes use phosgene or equivalent reagents, which produce chlorotriphenylphosphonium chloride, which is separately reduced.
For chiral phosphine oxides, deoxygenation can proceed with retention or inversion of configuration. Classically, inversion is favored by a combination of trichlorosilane and triethylamine, whereas in the absence of the Lewis base, the reaction proceeds with retention.  
HSiCl3 + Et3N ⇋ SiCl3− + Et3NH+
R3PO + Et3NH+ ⇋ R3POH+ + Et3N
SiCl3− + R3POH+ → PR3 + HOSiCl3

The popularity of this method is partly attributable to the availability of inexpensive trichlorosilane. Instead of HSiCl3, other perchloropolysilanes, e.g. hexachlorodisilane (Si2Cl6), can also be used. In comparison, using the reaction of the corresponding phosphine oxides with perchloropolysilanes such as Si2Cl6 or Si3Cl8 in benzene or chloroform, phosphines can be prepared in higher yields.
R3PO + Si2Cl6 → R3P + Si2OCl6
2 R3PO + Si3Cl8 → 2 R3P + Si3O2Cl8

Deoxygenation has been effected with boranes and alanes.

Catalytic processes
Phosphoric acids ((RO)2PO2H) catalyze the deoxygenation of phosphine oxides by hydrosilanes.

Use 
Phosphine oxides are ligands in various applications of homogeneous catalysis. In coordination chemistry, they are known to have labilizing effects to CO ligands cis to it in organometallic reactions. The cis effect describes this process.

Parent compound
The parent compound phosphine oxide (H3PO) is unstable. It has been detected with mass spectrometry as a reaction product of oxygen and phosphine, by means of FT-IR in a phosphine-ozone reaction and in matrix isolation with a reaction of phosphine, vanadium oxytrichloride and chromyl chloride. It has also been reported relatively stable in a water-ethanol solution by electrochemical oxidation of white phosphorus, where it slowly disproportionates into phosphine and hypophosphorous acid. Secondary phosphine oxides (R2P(O)H) are tautomers of phosphinous acids (R2POH). 

Phosphine oxide is reported as an intermediate in the room-temperature polymerization of phosphine and nitric oxide to solid PxHy.

References

Functional groups